Facundo Bagnis was the defending champion but lost in the semifinals to Thiago Monteiro.

Monteiro won the title after defeating Norbert Gombos 6–3, 7–6(7–2) in the final.

Seeds

Draw

Finals

Top half

Bottom half

References

External links
Main draw
Qualifying draw

Salzburg Open - 1